Aachen is a city in the German state of North Rhine-Westphalia.

Aachen may also refer to:

Free Imperial City of Aachen (1166–1801), a city of the Holy Roman Empire, formally ruled by the emperor only
Aachen (district), a district in the west of North Rhine-Westphalia, Germany
Aachen (electoral district), an electoral constituency represented in the German Bundestag
Aachen (meteorite), a meteorite, see meteorite falls
Hans von Aachen, (1552-1615), German mannerist painter
Aachen fine cloth

See also
Aachen Gospels (disambiguation)
Achen (disambiguation)